John Thibodeaux is an American actor and writer for CBS's The Late Show with Stephen Colbert. He also plays Jim Anchorton, a fictional character created for "Real News Tonight", a recurring segment on Late Show.  He has been nominated for a Primetime Emmy Award for Outstanding Writing - Variety Series. Before he was hired as a writer, he was a member of The Second City Touring Company.

References

External links

Year of birth missing (living people)
Living people
American television actors
African-American male actors
The Late Show with Stephen Colbert